The Josef and Anna Beran Bruha House, located west of Elyria, near Burwell in Valley County, Nebraska, was listed on the National Register of Historic Places in 1990.

It is one of only two examples in Valley County of the traditional Czech house type known as Dvoutrakt dum.  It is a one-story house with brick walls and a hipped roof.

They came directly to Valley County, where members of the Beran family were already located, and Josef had partway built the house and had tilled  of land by 1885.

References

Houses on the National Register of Historic Places in Nebraska
Houses completed in 1885
Buildings and structures in Valley County, Nebraska
1885 establishments in Nebraska